Kanopolis State Park contains a reservoir, desert plants such as yucca, a prairie dog town, and scenic sandstone canyons.  It is located in the Smoky Hills region of the U.S. state of Kansas.  The park is located southwest of the city of Salina, just south of I-70.

The park, completed in 1948, includes more than 22,000 acres (89 km²) of rolling hills, bluffs and woods and a 3000 acre (12 km²) lake, offering hunting, fishing, over 25 miles (40 km) of trails, and other recreational activities. Game includes pheasant, quail, prairie chickens, deer, beaver, wild turkey, squirrels, rabbits, coyotes and waterfowl; fishing for white bass and crappie is popular.

Park Attractions

The following are components of Kanopolis State Park recreation area:
 Kanopolis Lake
 Mushroom Rock State Park
 Faris Caves
 Smoky Hill Wildlife Area
 Horsethief Canyon

See also
 Kanopolis Lake
 List of Kansas state parks
 List of lakes, reservoirs, and dams in Kansas
 List of rivers of Kansas

References

External links
Kanopolis State Park Official Site

Protected areas of Ellsworth County, Kansas
Tourist attractions in Ellsworth County, Kansas
State parks of Kansas
Recreational areas in Kansas
Protected areas established in 1948
1948 establishments in Kansas